Methydrio (before 1927: Νεμνίτσα - Nemnitsa) is a village in the municipal unit of Vytina, Arcadia, Greece. In 2011, it had a population of 11. It sits at 1,060 m above sea level, at the foot of the Mainalo mountains. It is 4 km south of Vytina. It was named after the ancient city Methydrium, the remains of which have been discovered near the village.

Population

History

Ancient Methydrion was a city of ancient Arcadia. According to Pausanias it was founded by Orchomenus, son of Lycaon. In the 2nd century AD, it was not a city anymore, but a village belonging to Megalopolis. It was situated between the rivers Maloetas and Mylaon. It had a temple to Poseidon. The remains of ancient Methydrion have been excavated in 1910.

See also

List of settlements in Arcadia

References

External links
Methydrio at the GTP Travel Pages

Populated places in Arcadia, Peloponnese
Arcadian city-states
Vytina
Former populated places in Greece